Donald Charles McCall (born September 21, 1944 in Birmingham, Alabama) is a former professional American football player who played running back for four seasons for the New Orleans Saints and the Pittsburgh Steelers.

References 

1944 births
Players of American football from Birmingham, Alabama
American football running backs
USC Trojans football players
Pittsburgh Steelers players
New Orleans Saints players
Living people
Southern California Sun players